Francesca Summers is a British fashion model. She has been on the covers of British Vogue, Vogue Italia, and American Vogue.

Early life 
Summers was born in Richmond, Yorkshire, England, to Keith and Sandra Summers, who own a flooring  business; she has an older sister named Danielle and a brother named Lucas.

Career 

Summers was discovered at a MAC Cosmetics store; the next day she was signed by Storm Management. She debuted at Christopher Kane in 2016 and walked for Chloé, J.W. Anderson, Louis Vuitton, Valentino, Fendi, Chanel, Dior, Givenchy, Prada (for whom she was an exclusive), Saint Laurent, Loewe, Céline, and Miu Miu. She said watching shows like Ugly Betty and America's Next Top Model gave her a negative representation of the fashion industry culture and had initially discouraged her from pursuing modelling. For her campaigns with Bottega Veneta, Versace, Calvin Klein, Prada, Valentino, Chloé, and Marc Jacobs, she was chosen as one of the "Top 50" models by models.com.

References 

1999 births
Living people
People from Richmond, North Yorkshire
English female models
The Society Management models
Ford Models models
Elite Model Management models
Prada exclusive models